Manombo Sud is a rural municipality in Madagascar. It belongs to the district of Toliara II, which is a part of Atsimo-Andrefana Region.  The population of the commune was estimated to be approximately 17,000 in the 2001 commune census.

Primary and junior level secondary education are available in town. The majority (55%) of the population works in fishing. 35% are farmers, while an additional 5% receive their livelihood from raising livestock. The most important crops are cassava and sugarcane, while other important agricultural products are maize and lima beans.  Services provide employment for 5% of the population.

See also
 Tsifota - a fishing village of this municipality.

References

Populated places in Atsimo-Andrefana